1992 JEF United Ichihara season

Team name
Club nameJR East Furukawa Football Club
NicknameJEF United

Review and events

Competitions

Domestic results

Emperor's Cup

J.League Cup

Player statistics

Transfers

In:

Out:

Transfers during the season

In
none

Out
none

References

Other pages
 J. League official site
 JEF United Ichihara Chiba official site

JEF United Ichihara
JEF United Chiba seasons